Crediton Parish Church, formally the Collegiate Church of the Holy Cross and the Mother of Him who Hung Thereon, is a prominent building and worshipping community in the Devon town of Crediton.  The church is built on the site of what was the "cathedral" of the Bishop of Crediton in the former diocese until 1050 when the see was transferred to Exeter.  A college of canons remained at Crediton, administering the buildings and life of the "collegiate" church.  The nave and chancel of the current building date from the 15th century. At the English Reformation the church was surrendered to Henry VIII in 1545, and the college dispersed. The church buildings were bought by the Crediton Town Corporation who still administer the fabric today. Now a parish church, the life of the church is administered by the parochial church council (PCC), although many still refer to the church as the Collegiate Church of the Holy Cross.

The church is held in trust by the Governors of Crediton for the people of the parish, but its life and worship are planned by the clergy and parochial church council. The church is a Grade I listed building.

History
Crediton Church has a history which is as long as that of any church in Devon, including Exeter Cathedral. In the early 10th century Crediton was chosen as the site for the cathedral for Devon and Cornwall and a cathedral was built there c. 910 AD by Eadwulf of Crediton. In 1046 Leofric was appointed to both the sees and moved the Devon see to Exeter. The cathedra, the bishop's throne, was moved to Exeter in 1050, where it was placed in a Saxon minster until a purpose-built cathedral could be constructed which did not happen for many years.

Crediton had lost the see, but the Bishop of Exeter retained his palace there (a little to the north-east of Holy Cross) and his lands around the town. The church survived, though not in its original building. The construction of a Norman church on the present site was started—building work was in progress in the 1130s—and a collegiate church (based on the old cathedral and initially staffed by 18 canons with 18 vicars) was established, although lack of funds meant that the number of canons was soon reduced to 12.

The collegiate church was always completely secular: none of the canons or vicars lived the communal life of monks, their work being funded by income from tithes on the extensive lands of the parish (which were shared with the bishop).

The early dedication of the church was to St Mary, but the present dedication—the Church of the Holy Cross and the Mother of Him Who Hung Thereon—came into use only after the 1230s. The church was extended in the late 13th century by the addition of the Lady Chapel and the Chapter House.

John de Grandisson, Bishop of Exeter (1327–1369), attempted to ensure that at least the chief officers of the college, the precentor and the treasurer, were resident in the immediate area of the church. Grandisson had enormous influence on the church in Crediton in another way. This was by introducing—or reviving—the cult of St Boniface (the cult of the saints was in full swing at this time) and firmly established Crediton as his birthplace. A new statue of St Boniface was created in the 1970s by the sculptor Witold Gracjan Kawalec.

In a medieval will it was stated that the Norman nave of the church was being "now nearly levelled to the ground." The bequest of that testator, and others of around the same time, brought enough money for a complete rebuilding of the nave and chancel areas, which started in the early years of the fifteenth century. Great church building depended on generous funding being available. The Perpendicular Gothic rebuilding of Crediton Collegiate Church created a church which though impressive in scale is architecturally fairly modest.

The collegiate churches were dissolved between 1545 and 1549 and Crediton's was "surrendered" to Henry VIII in May 1545. Shortly afterwards the parishioners of Crediton entered into successful negotiations with the Crown for the purchase of the collegiate church which was then threatened with demolition. These were completed in the spring of 1547, when the town paid the sum of £200 to the king. In April 1547, Edward VI signed a charter which created a new organisation for the governance of the church. This was a corporation of 12 governors to administer the Parish Church and its endowments. A vicar of Crediton was appointed together with two chaplains, one of which ministered to Sandford (the adjoining parish).

The twelve governors of the Crediton Church Corporation, a registered charity, still own and administer the church buildings. Only two other parish churches in England, Ottery St Mary in Devon and Wimborne Minster in Dorset have a similar form of governance.

Popular sayings
"That’s Exter (Exeter), as the old woman said when she saw Kerton (Crediton)" is a Devonshire saying, meaning, I thought my work was done, but I find much still remains before it is completed.

Monuments
The principal monuments within the church include:
Monument with effigy of William Peryam (1534–1604), of Little Fulford (now Shobrooke Park) Lord Chief Baron of the Exchequer. North side of chancel.
Tuckfield Monument, north side of chancel, adjacent to the west side of the Peryam monument. Monument with seated effigy of Elizabeth Tuckfield (1593–1630). This family was resident at Little Fulford which they inherited from descendants of Peryam.
Heraldic window c.1924, south wall of south transept, bequeathed by W.M. Smith-Dorrien (d. 1924), Vicar of Crediton. Shows arms of many historic families associated with the parish.
De Sully effigies of John de Sully (1282–1388), and his wife Isobel. East end of south choir aisle. Sully was lord of the manor of Iddesleigh, but was said by Westcote to have had his seat at "Rookesford", i.e. Ruxford, in the parish of Sandford about 1/2-mile north-west of Crediton. He held Ruxford of John de Raleigh of Raleigh in the parish of Pilton, as is evidenced in the latter's deed of 1362 now held in the North Devon Record Office.
Memorial to Redvers Buller (1839–1908), of Downes House, army general, Victoria Cross recipient, lord of the manor of Crediton, west side of tower arch.

Organ

The War Memorial Organ was designed based on plans drawn by the church's organist Harold Organ in 1915. Organ was killed in action in 1917 but the plans were continued by Cyril Church.  The organ was built by Harrison and Harrison of Durham, and first used in 1921. The organ was restored and put in a new case in 2001.

Services

Sunday
 8:00 am: Holy Communion (BCP)
 9:30 am: Parish Eucharist (1st Sunday: Family Communion in the Boniface Centre)
 6:00 pm
 Choral Evensong with sermon (1st Sunday)
 Evensong at St Lawrence's Chapel (2nd Sunday)
 Evening Worship at Holy Cross (3rd Sunday)
 "Talkback" at the Boniface Centre (4th Sunday)
 Taize Vespers at St Lawrence's Chapel (5th Sunday)

Tuesday
 8:15 am: Holy Communion
 4:45 pm: Evening Prayer

Wednesday
 9:15 am: Morning Prayer
 12 noon: Holy Communion at St Lawrence's Chapel
 4:45 pm: Evening Prayer

Thursday
 8:15 am: Holy Communion
 4:45 pm: Evening Prayer

Friday
 8:15 am: Morning Prayer
 10:00 am: Holy Communion (BCP)
 4:45 pm: Evening Prayer

See also 
Churches and chapels of the United Benefice:
 St Lawrence, Crediton
 St Swithin's, Shobrooke
 St Swithun's, Sandford, Devon
 Beacon Church, Sandford (New Buildings)
 St Mary the Virgin, Upton Hellions
 Holy Trinity, Yeoford
 St Luke's, Posbury
 St Francis', Posbury

References

Further reading
 Reuter, Timothy (ed.) (1980). The Greatest Englishman: Essays on St Boniface and the Church at Crediton. Exeter: Paternoster Press.

External links 

 Crediton Parish Church
 Choir of Holy Cross
 The Search for Saxon Crediton

Crediton
Crediton
Diocese of Exeter
Former cathedrals in England
Crediton